"Get a Life" is a song by British R&B band Soul II Soul, released in November 1989 as the first single from their second album, Vol. II: 1990 – A New Decade (1990). It features Marcia Lewis and gained success in Europe, reaching number-one in Greece, number two in the Netherlands and number three in the UK. Additionally, it was a top 10 hit also in Austria, Belgium, Finland, West Germany, Ireland, Italy, Norway and Sweden. Outside Europe, the song peaked at number four in Zimbabwe and number five in New Zealand. In the UK, it sold over 200 000 copies and was certified Silver.

Critical reception
The song received positive reviews from music critics. J.D. Considine from The Baltimore Sun felt that "there are allusions to Philly soul in the way the bluesy "Elevate your mind" chorus is played off against a lush string arrangements, echoes of reggae in the deep thump of the bass, and definite African undercurrents to the use of conga and shekere — even if the rest of the drum sound is straight hip-hop." Bill Coleman from Billboard viewed it as a "familiar groove that's infectious nonetheless". Hannsjörg Riemann from German Bravo gave it three out of three, stating that the band already have the next hit with "Get a Life". He wrote further, "The thing, which was spiced up with a loud, rather undisciplined school children's choir in the background, should become a long-running hit this carnival." 

Forest Green III from The Michigan Daily opined that the song is a "constant stimulation, basically an ingenious engaging piece of rap/dance/soul/R&B fusion." He added that "helping the euphoric power of the piece are various references to the earlier singles, another perfectly crafted techno beat, a bit of the old "Feel Free" piano; flutes and strings humming in and out of the groove, and a female singer"." Pan-European magazine Music & Media called it "cool, breezy, funky, simple and effective. Effortlessly seductive and supremely self-assured." A reviewer from People Magazine noted that "a roiling bottom of drums, congas and bass underpins delicate instrumentation and the combined vocals of Jazzy B. rapping and Marcia Lewis and Daddae Harvey singing." Tom Doyle from Smash Hits complimented Lewis' singing voice as "marvellous". Nathaniel Wice from Spin wrote, "The underground club scene's party line is dance music. This is expressed perfectly in "Get a Life". The mellow, satisfied rap explains the title's imperative: "Implement your ideas, put them in motion.... Be an asset to the collective", while a child chorus nags "What's the meaning of life?" and Marcia Lewi's voice soars over the classical-sounding synth oceans, "Let your body take control.""

Track listing
 CD single, UK & Europe (1989)
"Get a Life" (7" Version) – 3:43
"Get a Life" (Club Mix) – 4:31
"Keep On Movin'" (Teddy Riley Remix) – 6:00
"Jazzie's Groove" (New Version) – 5:03                   

 CD single, US (1989)
"Get a Life" (12" Mix) – 4:48
"Get a Life" (Bonus Beats) – 3:46
"Get a Life" (Club Mix) – 4:28
"Fairplay" (12" Mix) – 5:55                   

 CD single, Japan (1990)
"Get a Life" – 3:44
"Jazzie's Groove" (New Version) – 5:04
"Back to Life" (Club Mix) – 7:40
"Keep On Movin'" (Club Mix) – 5:51

Charts

Weekly charts

Year-end charts

Certifications

References

1989 singles
1989 songs
Number-one singles in Greece
Song recordings produced by Nellee Hooper
Soul II Soul songs
Virgin Records singles
Songs written by Jazzie B